The Roman villa of Can Llauder is a Roman site near Mataró, Barcelona, Catalonia, Spain. 

Built in the first imperial period (1st century BC) and remodeled at the beginning of the 3rd century AD, the villa had a rich decor of marble and mosaics, with traces of stucco and paint. It was owned by several wealthy owners who possibly resided in the villa with his family and their slaves. An inscription has been found linking it to Gaius Marius. The villa was used until the Middle Ages when it fell into disrepair and ruin.

It is now conserved as a Bé Cultural d'Interès Nacional.

References
This article incorporates text initially translated from Catalan wikipedia

Ancient Roman buildings and structures in Catalonia
Roman villas in Spain
Bien de Interés Cultural landmarks in the Province of Barcelona
Ruined houses
Ruins in Spain
Mataró